The following is the final results of the Iranian Volleyball Super League (National unity and Islamic solidarity Cup) 2007/08 season.

Standings

 Steel Azin relegated as the worst team from Tehran.

Results

* Forfeit

References 
 volleyball.ir 
 Radio Sport

League 2007-08
Iran Super League, 2007-08
Iran Super League, 2007-08
Volleyball League, 2007-08
Volleyball League, 2007-08